The 1985 2. Divisjon was a second-tier football league in Norway. The league consisted of 24 teams, divided into groups A and B. The winners within each group were promoted to the 1986 1. divisjon. The second-place teams of each group met the tenth position finisher in the  1. divisjon in a qualification round, with the winner promoted to 1. divisjon. The bottom three teams of both groups were relegated to the 3. divisjon.

Tables

Group A

Group B

Promotion play-offs

Results
Tromsø – Sogndal 1–0
Sogndal – Moss 0–2
Moss – Tromsø 0–1

Tromsø won the qualification round and was promoted to the 1. divisjon.

Play-off table

References

Norwegian First Division seasons
1985 in Norwegian football
Norway
Norway